Tumanovo is a rural locality (a selo) and the administrative center of Tumanovsky Selsoviet, Soloneshensky District, Altai Krai, Russia. The population was 521 as of 2013. There are 7 streets.

Geography 
Tumanovo is located 32 km southeast of Soloneshnoye (the district's administrative centre) by road.

References 

Rural localities in Soloneshensky District